Campanula is one of several genera of flowering plants in the family Campanulaceae commonly known as bellflowers. They take both their common and scientific names from the bell-shaped flowers — campanula is Latin for "little bell".

The genus includes over 500 species and several subspecies, distributed across the temperate and subtropical regions of the Northern Hemisphere, with the highest diversity in the Mediterranean region east to the Caucasus. The range also extends into mountains in tropical regions of Asia and Africa.

Description
The leaves are alternate and often vary in shape on a single plant, with larger, broader leaves at the base of the stem and smaller, narrower leaves higher up; the leaf margin may be either entire or serrated (sometimes both on the same plant). Many species contain white latex in the leaves and stems.

The flowers are produced in panicles (sometimes solitary), and have a five-lobed corolla, typically large (2–5 cm or more long), mostly blue to purple, sometimes white or pink. Below the corolla, 5 leaf-like sepals form the calyx. Some species have a small additional leaf-like growth termed an "appendage" between each sepal, and the presence or absence, relative size, and attitude of the appendage is often used to distinguish between closely related species.

The fruit is a capsule containing numerous small seeds.

Campanula species are used as food plants by the larvae of some Lepidoptera species including common pug (recorded on harebell), dot moth, ingrailed clay (recorded on harebell), lime-speck pug and mouse moth.

Cultivation and uses
Well-known species include the northern temperate Campanula rotundifolia, commonly known as harebell in England and bluebell in Scotland and Ireland (though it is not closely related to the true bluebells), and the southern European Campanula medium, commonly known as Canterbury bells (a popular garden plant in the United Kingdom). As well as several species occurring naturally in the wild in northern Europe, there are many cultivated garden species.

The cultivars 'Misty Dawn' 
and 'Kent Belle' 
have gained the Royal Horticultural Society's Award of Garden Merit.

The species Campanula rapunculus, commonly known as rampion bellflower, rampion, or rover bellflower, is a biennial vegetable which was once widely grown in Europe for its spinach-like leaves and radish-like roots. In many English translations of the Brothers Grimm's tale Rapunzel, rampion is the vegetable that is stolen from the witch. (Rapunzel is a completely different plant, Valerianella locusta.)

In the UK the National Collection of campanulas is held at Burton Agnes Hall in East Yorkshire and the National Collection of Alpine Campanulas at Langham Hall, Bury St Edmunds, in Suffolk.

Related genera
The classification of some Campanulaceae genera as either part of Campanula or separate genera can vary by system, including Azorina, Campanulastrum, Canarina, Edraianthus, Musschia, Ostrowskia, and Platycodon. Some genera previously not segregated from Campanula currently are segregated in some systems, including Annaea, Gadellia, and Theodorovia. Hemisphaera was formerly Campanula, subsect. Scapiflorae, and Neocodon was Campanula sect. Rapunculus.

Species

There are 473, including:

 Campanula aghrica – Aghrian bellflower
 Campanula alliariifolia – Cornish bellflower
 Campanula alaskana
 Campanula alpestris
 Campanula alpina
 Campanula americana – American bellflower
 Campanula angustiflora – Eastwood's bellflower
 Campanula balfourii – Socotra bellflower
 Campanula barbata – bearded bellflower
 Campanula betulifolia
 Campanula bononiensis
 Campanula bravensis
 Campanula californica – swamp harebell
 Campanula carpatica – Carpathian bellflower
 Campanula cervicaria – bristly bellflower
 Campanula cochleariifolia – fairies' thimbles
 Campanula collina – blue dwarf bellflower
 Campanula divaricata – Appalachian bellflower
 Campanula exigua – chaparral bellflower
 Campanula garganica – Adriatic bellflower
 Campanula gelida
 Campanula glomerata – clustered bellflower
 Campanula griffinii – Griffin's bellflower
 Campanula hercegovina
 Campanula isophylla – Italian bellflower
 Campanula jacobaea
 Campanula lactiflora – milky bellflower
 Campanula lanata
 Campanula lasiocarpa
 Campanula latifolia – wide-leaved bellflower
 Campanula latiloba – great bellflower
 Campanula medium – Canterbury bells
 Campanula napuligera
 Campanula parryi
 Campanula patula – spreading bellflower
 Campanula pendula
 Campanula persicifolia – peach-leaved bellflower
 Campanula piperi – Piper's bellflower
 Campanula portenschlagiana – Dalmatian or wall bellflower
 Campanula poscharskyana – Serbian bellflower
 Campanula primulifolia – Spanish bellflower
 Campanula punctata
 Campanula pyramidalis – chimney bellflower
 Campanula raineri – Rainer's bellflower
 Campanula rapunculoides – creeping bellflower
 Campanula rapunculus – rampion bellflower
 Campanula robinsiae
 Campanula rotundifolia – harebell, bluebell
 Campanula scabrella – rough bellflower
 Campanula scheuchzeri
 Campanula scouleri – Scouler's or pale bellflower
 Campanula sharsmithiae – Sharsmith's or Mt. Hamilton bellflower
 Campanula shetleri – Castle Crags bellflower
 Campanula spicata
 Campanula takesimana – Korean bellflower
 Campanula thyrsoides 
 Campanula trachelium – nettle-leaved bellflower
 Campanula uniflora – Arctic bellflower
 Campanula wilkinsiana – Wilkin's bellflower
 Campanula zoysii

Formerly placed here
Adenophora gmelinii (Spreng.) Fisch. (as C. coronopifolia Schult. or C. gmelinii Spreng.)
Adenophora khasiana (Hook.f. & Thomson) Collett & Hemsl. (as C. khasiana Hook.f. & Thomson)
Adenophora liliifolia (L.) Besser (as C. liliifolia L.)
Adenophora triphylla (Thunb.) A.DC. (as C. tetraphylla Thunb. or C. triphylla Thunb.)
Azorina vidalii (H.C.Watson) Feer (as C. vidalii H.C.Watson)
Borago pygmaea (DC.) Chater & Greuter (as C. pygmaea DC.)
Legousia pentagonia (L.) Druce (as C. pentagonia L.)
Legousia speculum-veneris (L.) Durande ex Vill. (as C. speculum-veneris L.)
Platycodon grandiflorus (Jacq.) A.DC. (as C. glauca Thunb. or C. grandiflora Jacq.)
Triodanis perfoliata (L.) Nieuwl. (as C. perfoliata L.)
Wahlenbergia linarioides (Lam.) A.DC. (as C. linarioides Lam.)
Wahlenbergia marginata (Thunb.) A.DC. C. gracilis G.Forst. or C. marginata Thunb.)
Wahlenbergia undulata (L.f.) A.DC. (as C. undulata L.f.)

Chemistry 
Violdelphin is an anthocyanin, a type of plant pigment, found in the blue flowers in the genus Campanula.

Fossil record
Three fossil seeds of †Campanula palaeopyramidalis have been extracted from borehole samples of the Middle Miocene fresh water deposits in Nowy Sacz Basin, West Carpathians, Poland.

References

External links

 
Campanulaceae genera